The 2016 United States Senate election in Washington was held November 8, 2016, to elect a member of the United States Senate to represent the State of Washington. Incumbent Democratic Senator Patty Murray ran for re-election to a fifth term, and won by a significant margin, winning 59% of the vote, to Republican Chris Vance's 41%.

The election took place concurrently with the 2016 U.S. presidential election, as well as other elections to the United States Senate in other states and elections to the United States House of Representatives and various state and local elections.

Under Washington's nonpartisan blanket primary law, all candidates appear on the same ballot, regardless of party. In the August 2 primary, voters had the choice to vote for any candidate, regardless of their party affiliation. The top two finishers—regardless of party—advance to the general election in November, even if a candidate manages to receive a majority of the votes cast in the primary election. California is the only other state with this system, a so-called "top two primary" (Louisiana has a similar "jungle primary", but there is no general election if one candidate receives 50% plus one vote of all votes cast in the primary).

Primary election

Democratic Party

Declared 
 Thor Amundson
 Phil Cornell, retired communications technician
 Patty Murray, incumbent U.S. Senator
 Mohammed Said

Republican Party

Declared 
 Eric John Makus
 Uncle Mover
 Scott Nazarino
 Chris Vance, former state representative, former member of the King County Council, and former chair of the Washington State Republican Party

Declined 
 Bill Bryant, Seattle Port Commissioner (running for governor)
 Andy Hill, state senator
 Jaime Herrera Beutler, U.S. Representative (running for re-election)
 Steve Litzow, state senator (running for re-election)
 Rob McKenna, former attorney general of Washington and nominee for governor in 2012
 Cathy McMorris Rodgers, U.S. Representative (running for re-election)
 Dave Reichert, U.S. Representative (running for re-election)
 Dino Rossi, former state senator, nominee for Governor of Washington in 2004 and 2008, and nominee for U.S. Senate in 2010

Third party and independent candidates

Declared 
 Pano Churchill (Lincoln Caucus)
 Ted Cummings (Independent)
 Zach Haller (Independent)
 Chuck Jackson (Independent)
 Donna Rae Lands (Conservative)
 Mike Luke (Libertarian)
 Jeremy Teuton (System Reboot)
 Alex Tsimerman (StandUpAmerica)
 Sam Wright (Human Rights)

Results

General election

Debates

Predictions

Polling

with Rob McKenna

with Dave Reichert

with Jaime Herrera Beutler

with Cathy McMorris Rodgers

Results 
At 1,913,979 votes, Murray made history by receiving the most votes in a United States Senate election in Washington state.

By congressional district
Murray won 7 of 10 congressional districts including one represented by a Republican.

See also 
 United States Senate elections, 2016

References

External links 
Official campaign websites (Archived)
 Patty Murray (D) for Senate
 Chris Vance (R) for Senate

Washington
2016
United States Senate